John Sargent (April 6, 1792 – August 7, 1874) was a farmer, merchant and political figure in Nova Scotia. He represented Barrington township in the Legislative Assembly of Nova Scotia from 1736 to 1740 as a Conservative.

He was born in Barrington, Nova Scotia, the son of John Sargent and Margaret Whitney. In 1818, he married Sarah Wright Doane. Sargent was a justice of the peace and a captain in the militia. He died in Barrington at the age of 82.

His brothers William Browne and Winthrop also served in the assembly.

References 
 

1792 births
1874 deaths
Nova Scotia pre-Confederation MLAs
Winthrop family